Studying Abroad is an extended play by Jamaican-American singer Masego. It was released on November 13, 2020 by UMG Recordings, Inc. and EQT Recordings, LLC. The deluxe edition, Studying Abroad: Extended Stay, was released on May 21, 2021.

Background
Masego said the EP was inspired by his experiences in travelling saying "I took a lot of inspiration from Japan, South Africa, Nigeria, Amsterdam, and Stockholm." He also commented on releasing it during the COVID-19 pandemic and said "If the world is burning and crazy things are happening, I feel like I can help by just releasing music, just to escape that for a little bit." He spoke about his recording process during quarantine saying "Any producer that you could name has a high level of shyness and introversion. I've been in my crib. I'm always in the studio. I looked up to dudes staying in the studio for multiple summers and staying in their room figuring things out."

Promotion and singles
On September 16, 2020, Masego released the first single from the EP called "Passport", produced by D'Mile. On October 7, the second single, "Silver Tongue Devil" was released, with Shenseea. On November 10, he released the third single, "Mystery Lady", with Don Toliver.

Critical reception
In a positive review, Megan Walder of Clash wrote about the EP saying "Smooth sax entwined with a sophisticated exploration of lo-fi sound and beats, Masego has hit the ball running once more with this new EP Studying Abroad. Traversing the peaks and troughs of a relationship, the concept piece not only demonstrates his expansion in terms of collaborations and production choices but presents yet another side to this multifaceted artist."

Track listing

References

 

 
2020 albums
Albums produced by D'Mile
Albums produced by WondaGurl